Natalya Alyakina-Mrozek (ca. 1955–17 June 1995), often transliterated as Natalia, was a Russian broadcast journalist, who was working for the German radio news agency Rufa Rundfunk-Agenturdienste  and Focus magazine, in Budyonnovsk, Russia when she was killed during the First Chechen War.

Personal details
Natalya Alyakina-Mrozek was 40 years old when she was killed. She was married to Gisbert Mrozek, sometimes spelled Gizbert, who was also a working journalist for Rufa.

Death
While passing through an Army checkpoint in route to cover a mass hostage situation on June 17, 1995, Natalya Alyakina-Mrozek and the driver of the car were shot at by a Russian soldier. Her husband, Gisbert Mrozek was also present in the car but he was uninjured. Alyakina-Mrozek died minutes later from a gunshot wound to the neck.

Investigation
Immediately after the incident, a Russian judge ordered an investigation into premeditated murder. The Russian soldier was later found guilty of negligence in his use of his weapons, but a judge suspended his sentence as Chechen war participant.

See also
 List of journalists killed in Russia

References

1995 deaths
Murdered Russian journalists
Year of birth uncertain
People from Krasnodar